Philip J. Rarick (born 1940) was a justice of the Illinois Supreme Court from 2002 to 2004.

Born in Troy, Illinois, Rarick received a B.A. from Southern Illinois University and a J.D. from Saint Louis University School of Law. He entered private practice in Collinsville, Illinois in 1966, practicing until he became a judge of the Illinois Third Judicial Circuit in 1975. In 1988, he was elected to the Illinois Appellate Court for the Fifth District. In September 2002, the Illinois Supreme Court appointed Rarick to take Justice Moses Harrison's seat on that court upon the latter's retirement. Although he was expected to run for election to a full term in 2004, Rarick suffered a stroke in January 2003, and announced in September 2003 that he would not run for the seat.

References

Justices of the Illinois Supreme Court
1940 births
Southern Illinois University alumni
People from Troy, Illinois
Living people